Romash Tasuki Dass (born December 15, 1988) is a former baseball player from Japan. Dass played for the Nippon Ham Fighters in the Pacific League. Dass' career was hampered by injuries and the Fighters did not offer him a contract after the 2010 season.

Dass has been called "Darvish II" in Japanese press because he and Yu Darvish are both tall, biracial Japanese pitchers. Dass was born to an Indian father and Japanese mother.

References

Living people
1988 births
Japanese baseball players
Japanese people of Indian descent
Nippon Ham Fighters players
Sportspeople of Indian descent